Philip Hayes may refer to:

Philip Hayes (composer) (1738–1797), English organist and conductor
Philip C. Hayes (1833–1916), U.S. Representative from Illinois
Philip H. Hayes (born 1940), U.S. Representative from Indiana
Philip Hayes (United States Army officer) (1887–1949), U.S. Army general
Phil Hayes (born 1986), English cricketer
Phillip Hayes (Spiderman), fictional Spider-Man villain

See also
Phil Hay (disambiguation)
Philip Hays (born 1930), American illustrator
Philip Boucher-Hayes, head of RTÉ's Radio Investigative Unit